LC-13  may refer to:

 Babcock LC-13, a United States light civil aircraft
 Cape Canaveral Air Force Station Launch Complex 13, a launch complex which was used by Atlas rockets and missiles between 1958 and 1978